Bernd Niesecke (born 30 October 1958) is a German rower, who competed for the SC Dynamo Potsdam / Sportvereinigung (SV) Dynamo. He won the medals at the international rowing competitions. In October 1986, he was awarded a Patriotic Order of Merit in gold (first class) for his sporting success.

References

External links 
 

East German male rowers
1958 births
Living people
Olympic medalists in rowing
Olympic gold medalists for East Germany
Medalists at the 1988 Summer Olympics
World Rowing Championships medalists for East Germany
Olympic rowers of East Germany
Rowers at the 1988 Summer Olympics
Recipients of the Patriotic Order of Merit in gold